Kolosh is a village in Minabad Rural District, Anbaran District, Namin County, Ardabil Province, Iran. At the 2006 census, its population was 744, in 224 families.

References 

Towns and villages in Namin County